Cocaine Wars is a 1985 Argentine-American action film directed by Héctor Olivera and starring John Schneider, Federico Luppi, Rodolfo Ranni and Royal Dano. It was written by Olivera, Steven M. Krauzer and David Viñas. The associate producer of the film was Fernando Ayala. It premiered in Argentina on June 25, 1985.

Cocaine Wars is one of the ten films that Roger Corman produced in Argentina during the 1980s.

Synopsis 
Miami-based DEA agent Cliff Vickry (John Schneider) is in a South American nation (purportedly, Bolivia), working undercover within the organization of Gonzalo Reyes (Federico Luppi), the biggest cocaine exporter in South America. Cliff's significant other, Janet Meade (Kathryn Witt), is a reporter trying to gather evidence on Reyes. Reyes orders Cliff to kill Marcelo Villalba (John Vitali), a journalist who is running for his nation's position as president so he can bring Reyes down, but Cliff can't bring himself to kill Marcelo. Reyes is afraid Marcelo will put him out of business and is afraid that Janet's story will do the same thing, so Reyes sends someone else after Marcelo, and then Reyes has Janet kidnapped. Cliff is the only one who can rescue Janet and stop Reyes.

Cast 
 John Schneider ... DEA Agent Cliff Vickry
 Federico Luppi ... Gonzalo Reyes
 Royal Dano ... Bailey
 Rodolfo Ranni ... General Luján
 Kathryn Witt ... Janet Meade
 Ivan Grey ... Klausmann
 Richard Hamlin ... Wilhelm
 Edgar Moore ... Rikki
 Armand Capo ... Oswaldo
 Martin Korey ... Gomez
 Tom Cundom ... Bailey's driver
 Ken Edgar ... Kenny
 Joe Capanga ... Miguel
 Marcos Woinsky ... Pugg
 Jacques Arndt ... Franco
 Willy Marcos ... Hernandos
 John Vitali ... Marcelo Villalba
 Patti Davis ... Rosita (as Patricia Davis)
 Haydée Padilla ... Lola (as Heidi Paddle)
 Helen Grant ... Pia
 Theodore McNabney ... TV reporter #1 (as Ted McNabney)
 Patricia Scheuer ... TV reporter #2
 Martín Coria ... Gómez
 Edgardo Moreira ... Ricky
 Arturo Noal ... Julio
 Miguel Ángel Solá
 José Pablo Feinmann
 Juan Vitali

References

External links 
 
 
 

1985 films
1980s Spanish-language films
English-language Argentine films
1985 action films
American action films
Films directed by Héctor Olivera
Films about the illegal drug trade
Films about cocaine
American multilingual films
Argentine multilingual films
1980s English-language films
1985 multilingual films
Spanish-language American films
1980s American films
Argentine action films
1980s Argentine films